Carlos Alexandre Manarelli (born 13 February 1989) is a Brazilian road cyclist.

Major results

2009
 1st Gran Premio Industrie del Marmo
2010
 2nd Overall Giro della Regione Friuli Venezia Giulia
1st Stage 2
 5th Ruota d'Oro
 6th Trofeo Città di San Vendemiano
2011
 National Under-23 Road Championships
1st  Road race
1st  Time trial
 2nd Time trial, National Road Championships
 7th Giro del Belvedere
 10th Trofeo Banca Popolare di Vicenza
2012
 2nd Trofeo Papà Cervi
 5th Time trial, Pan American Road Championships
2014
 1st Overall Volta do Paraná
1st Points classification
1st Stages 2 & 3
 8th Road race, Pan American Road Championships
2015
 1st Copa América de Ciclismo
 3rd Overall Volta do Paraná

References

External links

1989 births
Living people
Brazilian male cyclists
Brazilian road racing cyclists
Sportspeople from Paraná (state)